Citizens Online is a UK basic digital skills and digital inclusion charity that was founded in 2000 by Mark Adams and CEO John Fisher. Its aim is to ensure this switch to online doesn't exclude people, and help to bridge the digital divide. The group works to help other organisations with the impacts of the switch to online services. The main service offered by Citizens Online is called Switch, which won "Best Digital Inclusion Product or Service" in the Digital Leaders Award for best product in 2015.

Current projects 

Digital Gwynedd Gwynedd Ddigidol launched in October 2015 with funding from the Big Lottery Fund, as an initial partnership between Gwynedd County Council and Citizens Online to work together to tackle digital exclusion across Gwynedd. As of January 2018 there were 35 partners involved in the project including Digital Communities Wales, Job Centre Plus, Cartrefi Cymru, Citizens Advice Gwynedd, Cyngor Gwynedd and BT.
Digital Brighton and Hove launched in February 2016 as a partnership with Brighton and Hove City Council and Citizens Online. The project was initially funded by Big Lottery Fund and BT. As of January 2018 there were 130 organisations working together in the cross sector partnership to tackle digital exclusion.

Fix the Web 

Fix the Web was Citizens Online's project to address digital accessibility issues for disabled people. The project won an award, was featured on the BBC and supported by Stephen Fry. An animation about the basics of web and software accessibility was launched on Global Accessibility Awareness Day in 2015, but the project failed to attract sufficient funding and is on hiatus.

With BT 

Corporations have played a role in the understanding and delivery of digital inclusion. Citizens Online have previously worked with and for BT Group Together, Citizens Online and BT supported research into the Social return on investment created by digital inclusion activity. BT's Get IT Together programme was run by Citizens Online in communities in the UK. Citizens Online was also involved in delivering BT's Everybody Online initiative, which started in 2002. EverybodyOnline included delivering basic digital skills to groups within specific demographics, such as people affected by homelessness in Glasgow. Citizens Online also reviewed BT's computer giveaway programme Community Connections.

Research and lobbying 

Primarily, Citizens Online focus on delivery of projects, however the organisation has also lobbied the UK government for greater input and join up around the digital inclusion agenda, including a speech at the Institute for Public Policy Research. A white paper produced with Trapeze Transformation suggested that digital inclusion is a systemic issue needing system-wide solutions and laid the foundations for the Switch programme of work. Citizens Online have also done research for Government Departments and agencies such as Nidirect and BECTA.

Award schemes 

Citizens Online have run; the 'Innovation on the Community' award scheme with AOL, the Microsoft Community Learning Awards, TalkTalk Digital Hero Awards, and the European Commission.

One Digital 

Citizens Online are part of the One Digital partnership with Age UK, Clarion Housing Group, Digital Unite, and Scottish Council for Voluntary Organisations. One Digital is funded by the Big Lottery Fund.

References

External links 
 
 Fix The Web
 One Digital

Digital divide
Information technology organisations based in the United Kingdom
Non-profit organisations based in the United Kingdom
Organisations based in Gloucestershire
Organizations established in 2000
Stroud